Denis Nikolaevich Shemelin (born July 24, 1978, in Ust-Kamenogorsk, Soviet Union) is a Kazakhstani professional ice hockey defenceman who currently plays for Amur Khabarovsk of the Kontinental Hockey League (KHL).

Career statistics

Regular season and playoffs

International

References

External links

1978 births
Living people
Amur Khabarovsk players
Kazakhstani ice hockey defencemen
Kazakhstani people of Russian descent
Olympic ice hockey players of Kazakhstan
Sportspeople from Oskemen
Ice hockey players at the 2006 Winter Olympics
Asian Games gold medalists for Kazakhstan
Asian Games silver medalists for Kazakhstan
Medalists at the 1999 Asian Winter Games
Medalists at the 2003 Asian Winter Games
Asian Games medalists in ice hockey
Ice hockey players at the 1999 Asian Winter Games
Ice hockey players at the 2003 Asian Winter Games